Alois Wotawa (11 June 1896 – 12 April 1970) was an Austrian composer of chess problems and endgame studies. He was born and died in Vienna. He was a prosecutor and a member of the Nazi Party.

Composition career
Wotawa composed more than 350 endgame studies, which were published particularly in German-speaking countries. Wotawa also composed some problems that he called "bungled endgames".

In 1966, FIDE honored Wotawa as an International Master of Chess Composition.

Example endgame study
In the following study, White finds an amazing move to force a draw.

Solution:
1. Ne5 Rd2+
2. Ke3 Re2+
3. Kd4 Rxe5
4. Rf6!! Forks the bishop and rook. If Black protects both with 4...Ra5, 5.Rg6 wins the pawn and draws. There remains only 4...g7xf6 stalemate.

Works
 Alois Wotawa: Auf Spurensuche mit Schachfiguren - 150 Endspielstudien [German language]. Vienna, 1965

References

1890s births
1970 deaths
Chess composers
Austrian sportspeople